The Gay and Lesbian Community Center of Southern Nevada, known to most simply as The Center, is a nonprofit organization located in Las Vegas, Nevada, that has served the local lesbian, gay, bisexual, transgender and queer community since 1993. The splendid building and the land on which it sits were  accomplished following a very generous bequest by Las Vegas educator and businessman Robert L. Forbuss.  The idea and scope of the project was suggested to Forbuss by his two closest friends, Las Vegas physicians Jerry L. Cade and Dennis M. Causey. In 2013, The Center moved into the new Robert L. Forbuss Building in Downtown Las Vegas and began also serving the low to moderate income residents of the area. Programs and services are generally free to the public. The Center is a member of Centerlink, the national membership organization for LGBT centers.

Programs and Services
The Center's staff leads several groups that meet weekly:
 ACT III (Aging Communities Together) — for seniors 50 and up
 Identi-T* — for transgender and gender non-conforming individuals
 QVolution — for youth ages 13 to 24
 Vegas Mpowerment Project — for gay, bisexual and transgender men 18 to 35
 ELLE — for lesbian and bisexual women 18 to 30
 The F Word — a group to discuss feminism

Numerous peer-led groups also meet at The Center, including:
 Alcoholics Anonymous, Marijuana Anonymous, Narcotics Anonymous, Sex Addicts Anonymous
 Gay Men's Forum
 The L Group

Many services are offered free of charge to the public:
 David Bohnett CyberCenter
 David Parks LGBTQ Lending Library
 Free HIV and syphilis testing for Nevada residents
 Free vaccinations for Nevada residents
 Information and referrals to other local organizations and services

Noteworthy Happenings
At a pro-marriage equality rally at The Center's previous location in 2008, comedian Wanda Sykes gave a speech and came out as being in a same-sex relationship, one month after marrying her partner, Alex Niedbalski.

Nevada State Senator Kelvin Atkinson proposed to his partner, Woody, at a rally held at The Center on Tuesday, October 7, 2014, celebrating the 9th U.S. Circuit Court of Appeals' decision to overturn Nevada's prohibition on gay marriage.

Following the legalization of same-sex marriage in Nevada but prior to the Supreme Court's ruling granting same-sex marriage in the United States, The Center hosted its first transgender wedding ceremony on March 21, 2015, between Jazmynne Young and Mark Matthews.

Oregon bakers Aaron and Melissa Klein from Sweet Cakes by Melissa, a business fined for refusing service to a lesbian couple in 2013, mailed a cake to several LGBT organizations, including The Center, in August 2015 with a heart-shaped message on top saying "We really do love you". The cake was accompanied by a DVD of the film Audacity by Ray Comfort.

Vandalism
The center was vandalized twice in 2019: with an arson in June, and with a spray-painted slur in September. In response, the director of operations explained, "it energizes us to dig in deeper and really work hard to continue what we normally do. ... We want to be happy, joyous and free just like anyone else, but it requires we have to fight and work for it."

See also

List of LGBT community centers in the United States
LGBT rights in Nevada
Same-sex marriage in Nevada

References

External links

 
 "The LGBT Center's GenderSense Brought Transgender Issues to Light" — by Mark Adams, Las Vegas Weekly
 "Discussing the LGBT Center's Downtown Move with Program Director Mel Goodwin" — by Mark Adams, Las Vegas Weekly

1993 establishments in Nevada
Buildings and structures completed in 2013
Buildings and structures in Las Vegas
LGBT community centers in the United States